This page presents the results of the men's and women's volleyball tournament of the 1995 Pan American Games, which was held in the Polideportivo from 12 March to 18 March 1995 in Mar del Plata, Argentina.

Medal summary

Medal table

Events

Men's indoor tournament

Teams

Group A
 
 
 

Group B

Preliminary round

Final round

Final ranking

Individual awards

Women's indoor tournament

Preliminary round robin

Final round

Final ranking

Individual awards

References
 
 

Events at the 1995 Pan American Games
1995
Pan American Games